Maltese is an Italian surname, meaning literally "Maltese" or "from Malta". Notable people with the surname include:

 Dario Maltese (born 1992) Italian footballer
 Michael Maltese, American writer, actor, soundtrack composer
 Serphin Maltese, American politician

Italian toponymic surnames